The 2019 Formula Nordic season was the seventh season of the single-seater championship, and the first without the STCC branding following the series' promoter's bankruptcy. Instead, the series formed its own association, relaunching under the Formula Nordic brand but continuing to use the previous Formula Renault 1.6 chassis and engines, as it used to go under the name of Formula Renault 1.6 Nordic before Renault Sport dropped its support for the 3.5 and 1.6 classes in late 2015. 
The season began on 3 May at Ring Knutstorp and concluded on 5 October at Mantorp Park after eight rounds, Edward Sander Woldseth took the main (NEZ) title, with Viktor Andersson winning the junior (JSM) crown.

Drivers and teams

Race calendar and results

The season started on 3 May at Ring Knutstorp and finished on 5 October at Mantorp Park after eight rounds, often supported by the Porsche Carrera Cup Scandinavia and the TCR Scandinavia, the successor to the STCC, as well as various GT series. This season was the first to use reversed grid races for the final race of the weekend, where the top 6 were inverted.

Footnotes

Championship standings
Qualifying points system
Points are awarded to the top 5 fastest qualifying times.

Race points system
Points are awarded to the top 10 classified finishers. 

Two championships are held, the Junior Svenskt Mästerskap (JSM) for drivers under 26 years old holding a Swedish driver license, and the Northern European Zone (NEZ) championship, the latter served as the overall championship, with the JSM points tally excluding round 2.

Formula Nordic Drivers' Championship (NEZ and JSM)

References

External links
 Official website

Formula Nordic
Formula Renault
 Nordic